Media Wales Ltd. is a publishing company based in Cardiff, Wales. As of 2009 it was owned by Reach plc (formerly known as the Trinity Mirror Group). It was previously known as the Western Mail & Echo Ltd.

History

The Western Mail was founded in 1869 by the 3rd Marquess of Bute as a Conservative newspaper. In 1893, the original building in St. Mary Street was destroyed by fire and a new building was opened also in St Mary Street two years later.

In 1928 the Western Mail Ltd amalgamated with David Duncan & Sons, who published the South Wales Daily News and the South Wales Echo, which was established in 1884. The merged company became Western Mail and Echo Ltd. and because of the merger Evening Express and South Wales Daily News closed. In 1960, the newspapers left St Mary Street and moved to Thomson House, Cardiff.

On 1 October 2007 Western Mail and Echo Ltd changed its name to Media Wales, and in 2008 Media Wales moved from Thomson House in Havelock Street to a newly built office block, named Six Park Street, next to the old building.

The printing plant relocated to Portmanmoor Road, where it printed the Western Mail, South Wales Echo, South Wales Evening Post and the Llanelli Star. It also printed other independently owned titles, including the Pembrokeshire Herald. In November 2016, the parent company Trinity Mirror (Reach plc), announced its plans to close the printing plant and transfer all printing to either its printing plants in Birmingham or Watford.

WalesOnline
WalesOnline is the Media Wales website for Welsh news. Its editor is Steffan Rhys.

CardiffOnline
Cardiff Online is Media Wales' portal for news from the country's capital. The different sections include information on local community news, yourCardiff, lifestyle, Parklife (local sport), Cardiff Blues, Cardiff City F.C. and Cardiff Devils.

Pizzaman
Pizzaman is Wales’ first online drama series, broadcast by WalesOnline. The mini-series was created by former film students Teilo Trimble and James Robson, who took inspiration from Robson's stint as a takeaway driver following graduation.

It featured 15 short films ranging between four and eight minutes, all shot in different locations around Cardiff, which follow student deliveryman Taj. Each episode is named after a district of Cardiff.

Publications

The company also operates several news websites focused on Welsh news and classified advertising.

Media Wales titles are published by Trinity Mirror North West & North Wales, part of Reach plc and include:
Monday to Saturday:
Western Mail
South Wales Echo
South Wales Evening Post
Weekly:
Wales on Sunday
Llanelli Star
Carmarthen Journal
Echo Extra formerly Cardiff Post
Celtic Weekly Newspapers:
Cynon Valley Leader
Glamorgan Gazette
Gwent Gazette
Merthyr Express
Pontypridd & Llantrisant Observer
Rhondda Leader
Rhymney Valley Express
JobsWales

Gallery

References

External links

 

Newspapers published in Wales
Companies based in Cardiff
British news websites